Major Samuel Hollingsworth Stout (March 3, 1822 – September 18, 1903) was an American farmer, slaveholder, teacher and surgeon. In the Antebellum era, he was the owner of a farm with slaves in Giles County, Tennessee. During the American Civil War, he was a surgeon to the Army of Tennessee and later in charge of sixty hospitals for the Confederate States Army in Georgia, Alabama, and Mississippi. He later taught at the Atlanta Medical College (now known as the Emory University School of Medicine), and he practiced medicine in Texas. He was a co-founder and the founding dean of the Baylor College of Medicine in 1902-1903.

Early life
Samuel Hollingsworth Stout was born on March 3, 1822, in Nashville, Tennessee. His father, Samuel Van Dyke Stout, was the owner of a carriage factory and the mayor of Nashville. He had three brothers and one sister. He was raised as a Presbyterian.

Stout was educated at the Classical and Mathematical Seminary in Nashville. He graduated from the University of Nashville in 1839 with an A.B., and he earned an M.D. from the University of Pennsylvania's medical school in 1848.

Career
Stout became a surgeon for the United States Navy but resigned as the American-Mexican War was coming to an end. Instead, he practiced medicine in Giles County, Tennessee, where he owned a farm with slaves. He also became an early member of the Tennessee Historical Society.

At the outset of the American Civil War, on May 17, 1861, Stout became a major of cavalry in the Confederate States Army. He was a surgeon to the Third Tennessee Infantry from May to November 1861, and to Gordon Hospital in Nashville from November 1861 to February 1862. He subsequently moved to Chattanooga, where he was in charge of hospitals for the Army of Tennessee. By the summer of 1864, his responsibilities had expanded to sixty Confederate hospitals in the Southern states of Georgia, Alabama, and Mississippi. By the end of the war, he had lost his Giles County farm.

Stout was a professor of surgery at the Atlanta Medical College, later known as the Emory University School of Medicine, from 1866 to 1867. He practised medicine in Georgia until 1882, when he moved to Cisco, Texas; he taught and practiced medicine in Dallas. Additionally, he was a co-founder of the Medical Department of the University of Dallas (now known as the Baylor College of Medicine), and he served as its founding dean from 1902 to 1903.

Personal life and death
Stout married Martha Moore Abernathy in 1848. They had seven children. He died on September 18, 1903, in Clarendon, Texas.

References

Further reading

External links

Samuel Hollingsworth Stout papers, at the Georgia Historical Society
Samuel Hollingsworth Stout Papers, 1819-1963, Tennessee Historical Society Collection, Tennessee State Library and Archives
Stuart A. Rose Manuscript, Archives, and Rare Book Library, Emory University: Samuel Hollingsworth Stout papers, 1800-1899

1822 births
1903 deaths
People from Nashville, Tennessee
People from Giles County, Tennessee
Military personnel from Dallas
University of Nashville alumni
Perelman School of Medicine at the University of Pennsylvania alumni
Confederate States Army surgeons
People from Cisco, Texas